The Stuff (also known as Larry Cohen's The Stuff) is a 1985 American satirical science fiction horror film written and directed by Larry Cohen and starring Michael Moriarty, Garrett Morris, Andrea Marcovicci, and Paul Sorvino. It was also the last film of Alexander Scourby. In the film, a sweet and addictive alien substance becomes a popular dessert in the United States, but soon begins attacking people and turning them into zombies. This film is a satire on the American lifestyle and consumer society.

Plot
Several quarry workers in Georgia discover a white cream-like alien substance bubbling out of the ground. These workers find it to be sweet and addictive. Later, the substance, marketed as "The Stuff," is sold to the general public in containers like ice cream. It is marketed as having no calories and as being sweet, creamy, and filling. The Stuff quickly becomes a nationwide craze and drastically hurts the sales of ice cream.

Former FBI agent turned industrial saboteur David "Mo" Rutherford is hired by the leaders of the suffering ice cream industry, as well as junk food mogul Charles W. "Chocolate Chip Charlie" Hobbs, to find out exactly what The Stuff is and destroy it.

Under their commissions, Rutherford investigates The Stuff. His efforts reveal, to his initial horror, that the craze for the dessert is far deadlier than anyone had believed: The Stuff is actually a living, parasitic, and possibly sentient organism that gradually takes over the brain; it then mutates those who eat it into bizarre zombie-like creatures, before consuming them from the inside and leaving them empty shells of their former selves.

A young boy named Jason also discovers The Stuff is alive and sees how it affects his family and how they are adamantly against his beliefs about The Stuff. He gets arrested for vandalizing a supermarket display of The Stuff, attracting the attention of Rutherford, who comes to his aid. Rutherford also manages to charm Nicole, an advertising executive who becomes his partner and lover when she sees the effect of The Stuff. The trio infiltrates the distribution operation, an organized corporate effort to spread The Stuff to eliminate world hunger, and destroy the lake of The Stuff with explosives. Meanwhile, United States Army Col. Malcolm Grommett Spears, a retired soldier, teams up with the trio and leads a militia in battling the zombies and transmitting a civil defense message for Americans to break their addiction to The Stuff by destroying it with fire. However, in their efforts to warn the public, Charlie is zombified at the Colonel's radio station; The Stuff bursts out of his throat, and Nicole and Jason are cornered in a recording booth by the dangerous ooze. Rutherford lights The Stuff on fire, and then they make their broadcast. The Stuff addiction is ended, and Rutherford, Nicole, Jason, and Col. Spears are hailed as national heroes.

Mo then visits the head of The Stuff Company, Mr. Fletcher. He tells Mo that the destruction of the mine has not hurt his business since The Stuff seeps out from many places in the ground, but Mo vows to find those places and get rid of them all. Another man, Mr. Vickers, brings in Mr. Evans, the ice cream mogul with whom he is now working—and who had initially hired Mo to find out about what The Stuff was. They tell him they have come up with a new product called "The Taste," which is a mix of 88% ice cream and 12% The Stuff, supposedly enough to make people crave more without it taking over their minds or killing them. However, Mo then brings in Jason, who is carrying a box, and then holds the two moguls at gunpoint. The box is full of pint containers of The Stuff, and Mo forces both to eat them all as punishment for all the lives lost to it and for their greed. As they do, Rutherford asks, "Are you eating it, or is it eating you?" When they finish, Mo and Jason leave them to the approaching police.

The film ends with smugglers selling The Stuff on the black market, having one of the smugglers tasting The Stuff, and revealing that samples of The Stuff still exist. In a post-credits scene, a woman in a bathroom says, "Enough is never enough" while holding The Stuff.

Cast

Production

Shooting for the film was brief starting in August 1984 and wrapping shortly in September. Filming locations included New Paltz, New York, New York City and Los Angeles. Post production began in January 1985 at Raleigh Studios in Los Angeles and continued into the summer. The Mohonk Hotel was notably used as Colonel Malcolm Grommett Spears’ headquarters in the film.

Multiple puppets were used to simulate the deaths of characters who had become hosts of The Stuff. Four models of Garrett Morris' head were made for Charlie's transformation sequence, one of which Cohen still claimed to own. When The Stuff was eaten on screen, ice cream, yogurt and whipped cream were used. 

The script was an original story by Cohen. He said, "My main inspiration was the consumerism and corporate greed found in our country and the damaging products that were being sold. I was constantly reading in the newspapers about various goods and materials being recalled because they were harming people. For example, you had foods being pulled off the market because they were hazardous to people’s health."

Cohen cited as his influence, "the sheer volume of junk food we consume every day. We continue to eat these foods despite the fact some of them are killing us. That’s when I started thinking that The Stuff could be an imaginary product— in this case an ice cream dessert— that is being consumed by millions and is doing irreparable damage to humanity. Everybody is gobbling down this yummy food, so how can it possibly be wrong for us?"

Cohen wanted to cast Arsenio Hall as "Chocolate Chip Charlie" W. Hobbs, since he thought he was not only a good actor but a rising star.  The executives at New World Pictures, however, wanted someone more recognizable and thus cast Garrett Morris instead. Morris did not enjoy working with Cohen; in a "Random Roles" section at AV Club where Morris was asked about "The Stuff", he simply said that if he did not respect someone he would not talk about them, and therefore he had nothing to say about Larry Cohen (https://www.avclub.com/garrett-morris-on-snl-2-broke-girls-and-singing-arias-1798268909).

Release
Cohen says the film was significantly trimmed in post-production:
We did lose a few funny scenes that I wanted to keep. When I showed New World my original cut, they felt strongly that the film should move a lot faster. I realized that I'd made a picture that was a little too dense and sophisticated, so we increased the pacing. I know that along with some of the commercials, we did lose a romantic scene between Moriarty and Andrea that took place in a hotel room. It was perhaps a wise decision to cut some of those scenes out, because I don't think they played well in the totality of the film. The story needed to drive forward at certain points and not be slowed down with extraneous material, although it can be painful cutting scenes out that you like.

Cohen says that the New World Pictures Company was slightly unhappy with the resulting movie:
New World wanted a straight-up horror film, and, in retrospect, The Stuff had more comedic aspects to it than the executives were perhaps expecting. They thought they were going to get a flat-out horror movie with a lot of gore and scares, and we made a film that was more satirical and had a lot of humour and commentary in it. We played the characters for laughs in many cases and that greatly diluted the horror element. It made The Stuff more of what I would consider "A Larry Cohen Movie" but less of a conventional, commercial horror film. I think New World were disappointed that The Stuff wasn’t more horrific and nasty – more of a balls-out monster movie. I knew before the film even hit theaters The Stuff would appeal to a different audience than the one we were trying to get.

The Stuff was given a limited theatrical release in the United States by New World Pictures in June 1985.

The film was not a hit, and Cohen feels that it was hurt by the fact it was sold as a horror film, when it was basically a satirical comedy. Cohen stated, "the day The Stuff opened in New York a hurricane hit and the newspapers were not delivered. Of course, we had received all these great reviews, but it didn’t matter because nobody ever got to read a single word of them."

Home media
The film was released on VHS and Betamax by New World Home Video. It was eventually released on DVD by Anchor Bay Entertainment in 2000.

On September 20, 2011, Image Entertainment released The Stuff under its "Midnight Madness Series" banner on DVD. It is a direct port of the Anchor Bay Entertainment DVD release.

A Special Edition Blu-ray was released in the United Kingdom on April 19, 2016, by Arrow Films.

Copyright dispute
The company Effects Associated were hired by Cohen to supply some of the special effects shots. When the shots were delivered, Cohen was not satisfied with shots of exploding factory buildings and paid only half (c. $8,000) of the agreed price for those shots. Effects Associated brought an action against Cohen in court to claim full compensation, but also because the parties had no written copyright agreement regarding the use of the shots. The trial court decided in favor of Cohen, ruling that there was an "implied agreement" for the non-exclusive use of the shots in the film. The Court of Appeals for the Ninth Circuit confirmed the ruling, and confirmed that Effects Associated still retained the copyright for use outside of The Stuff.

Reception
Colin Greenland reviewed The Stuff for White Dwarf #77, and stated that "A  brilliant performance by Cohen stalwart Michael Moriarty as an industrial spy  after the truth holds the straggling plot together."
It received positive reviews from critics: on review aggregator website Rotten Tomatoes, the film has a 71% rating, based on 14 reviews.

See also
Bride of Frankenstein
Corpus Earthling
The Thing (1982 film)
The Fly (1986 film)
King Kong Lives
The Blob (1988 film)
Society (film)
Night of the Living Dead (1990 film)
Body Snatchers (1993 film)
Ice Cream Man (film)
Species (film)
Bride of Chucky
Shaun of the Dead
The Thing (2011 film)
List of media spin-offs

References

External links
 
 
 Review of film at AV Club

1985 films
1985 horror films
1980s comedy horror films
1980s monster movies
American comedy horror films
American science fiction horror films
American satirical films
American black comedy films
1980s English-language films
Films directed by Larry Cohen
Fictional amorphous creatures
American monster movies
Films about extraterrestrial life
Fictional food and drink
Films set in the 1980s
Films shot in New Jersey
Films shot in New York City
American independent films
New World Pictures films
American parody films
1985 comedy films
Film spin-offs
Films with screenplays by Larry Cohen
1980s American films